James Hiram West (August 8, 1884 – May 25, 1963) was a Major League Baseball pitcher who played for two seasons. He pitched in six games for the Cleveland Naps during the 1905 season and 13 games during the 1911 season. He attended Knox College and Lombard College.

External links

1884 births
1963 deaths
Major League Baseball pitchers
Cleveland Naps players
Baseball players from Illinois
Knox Prairie Fire baseball players
Wilkes-Barre Barons (baseball) players
Toledo Mud Hens players
Nashville Vols players
Zanesville Potters players
Portland Beavers players
Los Angeles Angels (minor league) players
Salt Lake City Bees players
Venice Tigers players
Vernon Tigers players
San Francisco Seals (baseball) players
Sacramento Senators players
People from Roseville, Illinois